was the sixth head of a cadet branch of the Japanese imperial family, and a career army officer who served as Chief of the Imperial Japanese Army General Staff from 1931 to 1940. During his tenure as the Chief of the Imperial Japanese Army General Staff, the Imperial Japanese Army committed numerous war crimes against Chinese civilians including the Nanking massacre and the systemic use of chemical and bacteriological weapons. Prince Kan'in Kotohito died several months before the end of the Second World War and was not tried for war crimes.

Early years
Prince Kotohito was born in Kyoto on November 10, 1865 as the sixteenth son of Prince Fushimi Kuniye (1802–1875). His father was the twentieth head of the Fushimi-no-miya, one of the four shinnōke, branches of the Imperial Family which were eligible to succeed to the throne if the main line should die out. Since the infant mortality rate in the main imperial household was quite high, Emperor Kōmei, the father of Emperor Meiji, adopted Prince Kotohito as a potential heir. Prince Kotohito was thus the adopted brother of Emperor Meiji and a great uncle to both Emperor Shōwa and his consort, Empress Kōjun.

Prince Kotohito was initially sent to Sambō-in monzeki temple at the age of three to be raised as a Buddhist monk, but was selected in 1872 to revive the Kan'in-no-miya, another of the shinnōke households, which had gone extinct upon the death of the fifth head, Prince Naruhito.

Marriage and family
On December 19, 1891, Prince Kotohiko married Sanjō Chieko (January 30, 1872 – March 19, 1947), a daughter of Prince Sanjō Sanetomi. The couple had seven children: five daughters and two sons.

Early military career

Prince Kan'in entered the Imperial Japanese Army Academy in 1877 and graduated in 1881. Emperor Meiji sent him as a military attaché to France in 1882 to study military tactics and technology. He graduated from the Army Staff College in 1894, specializing in cavalry. He commanded the 1st Cavalry Regiment from 1897 to 1899.

Kan'in became a veteran of both the First Sino-Japanese War (1894–1895) and the Russo-Japanese War (1904–1905). He was appointed to command the 2nd Cavalry Brigade in 1901. He rose to the rank of lieutenant general in 1905 and became the commander of the IJA 1st Division in 1906, and the Imperial Guard Division in 1911. He was promoted to the rank of full general and became a Supreme War Councilor in 1912. He was further promoted to become the youngest field marshal in the Imperial Japanese Army in 1919. In 1921, he accompanied then-Crown Prince Hirohito on his tour of Europe.

Career in the Imperial General Headquarters

On December 1, 1931, Prince Kan'in became Chief of the Imperial Japanese Army General Staff, replacing General Kanaya Hanzo. During his tenure, the Imperial Japanese Army committed many war crimes against Chinese civilians including the Nanking massacre and the systemic use of chemical and bacteriological weapons. Chemical weapons, such as tear gas, were used only sporadically in 1937, but in the spring of 1938, the Imperial Japanese Army began full-scale use of sneeze and nausea gas (red), and from summer 1939, mustard gas (yellow) was used against both Kuomintang and Communist Chinese troops. Prince Kan'in transmitted to the Army the emperor's first directive (rinsanmei) authorizing the use of chemical weapons on July 28, 1937. He transmitted a second order on September 11 authorizing the deployment of special chemical warfare units to Shanghai. On April 11, 1938, Directive Number 11 was issued in his name, authorizing further use of poison gas in Inner Mongolia.

Kan'in, among others within the army, opposed Prime Minister Yonai Mitsumasa's efforts to improve relations with the United States and the United Kingdom. He forced the resignation of War Minister General Hata Shunroku (1879–1962), thus bringing down the Yonai cabinet in July 1940. The Prince was a participant in the liaison conferences between the military chiefs of staff and the second cabinet of Prince Konoe Fumimaro (June 1940–July 1941). Both he and Lieutenant General Hideki Tojo, the newly appointed War Minister, supported the Tripartite Pact between the Empire of Japan, Nazi Germany, and Fascist Italy.

Final years and death 

Kan'in retired as Chief of the General Staff on October 3, 1940 and was succeeded by Sugiyama Hajime. He remained a member of the Supreme War Council and a senior advisor to the emperor on army matters. Field Marshal Prince Kan'in died in Odawara, Kanagawa at the Kan'in summer residence, possibly due to an infection caused by inflamed hemorrhoids on May 21, 1945 and was accorded a state funeral.

The Prince was a strong supporter of State Shinto; with Hiranuma Kiichirō he set up the Shintoist Rites Research Council to research all ancient Shinto rites and practices. Other associates were Kuniaki Koiso, Lieutenant General Heisuke Yanagawa, who directed the Taisei Yokusankai and Chikao Fujisawa, member of the Diet of Japan, who proposed a law that Shinto should be reaffirmed as Japan's state religion.

His only son, Prince Kan'in Haruhito, succeeded him as the seventh and last head of the Kan'in-no-miya household.

Honours 

He received the following orders and decorations:
 : 
 Collar of the Order of the Chrysanthemum
 Order of the Golden Kite, 1st Class
 : Grand Cross of the Legion of Honour, 5 October 1895
 : Knight of the Order of St. Alexander Nevsky, 2 November 1898
 : Grand Cordon of the Royal Order of Leopold, with Swords, 28 April 1900
 : Knight of the Order of the Annunciation, 20 May 1900
 : Order of Osmanieh, 1st Class, 29 May 1900
 : Grand Cross of the Order of St. Stephen, 7 June 1900
 :
 Grand Cross of the Order of the Red Eagle, 23 June 1900
 Knight of the Order of Merit of the Prussian Crown, with Swords, 22 June 1906
  Hohenzollern: Cross of Honour of the Princely House Order of Hohenzollern, 1st Class, with Swords, 18 November 1905
 : Order of the Double Dragon, Class I Grade II, 27 January 1904
 : Honorary Knight Grand Cross of the Order of St Michael and St George, 1921

Gallery

Notes

References

Books

External links

1865 births
1945 deaths
People from Kyoto Prefecture
Japanese princes
Kan'in-no-miya
Japanese Shintoists
Marshals of Japan
Japanese military personnel of the First Sino-Japanese War
Japanese military personnel of the Russo-Japanese War
Japanese generals
Japanese people of World War II
People of Meiji-period Japan
Recipients of the Order of the Golden Kite
Grand Crosses of the Order of Saint Stephen of Hungary
Grand Croix of the Légion d'honneur
Honorary Knights Grand Cross of the Order of St Michael and St George